Marroquina is an administrative neighborhood (barrio) of Madrid belonging to the district of Moratalaz. It is 1.789256 km2 in size and has a 6,746 m perimeter.

References 

Wards of Madrid
Moratalaz